Vasily Klyukin (born March 3, 1976, Moscow, USSR) is a Russian sculptor, architect, former businessman in the financial and development sectors.

Biography

Entrepreneur activity 

Starting 2009, Klyukin was involved in real estate development, particularly in the reconstruction of buildings and changing the purpose of the property.

In 2011, he completely abandoned entrepreneurial activity, got rid of his assets and decided to devote his life to art.

Charity 
Vasily Klyukin has long been involved in philanthropy, supporting a large number of organizations, and his sculptures are sold at charity auctions of the most important foundations, such as UNICEF, WWF, Naked Heart, amfAR, Leonardo DiCaprio Foundation, Prince Albert II Foundation, Andrea Bocelli Foundation.

Creative Career (Sculptures) 
Klyukin works in areas such as architecture, abstract and kinetic sculpture. He works in his signature technique, where the sculpture plates are assembled without fasteners or welding, forming a three-dimensional piece. This principle is the basis for the sculptural works from the In Dante Veritas series, presented in the courtyard of the Mikhailovsky Castle of the State Russian Museum in 2018.

He designed the Golden Madonnina statuette for the Milan Design Week 2017, and in 2021 he designed the award for the Russian edition of PEOPLETALK.

Art history books about Klyukin's work are published by such global publishers as Skira Editore (Milan); Palace Editions (The State Russian Museum, Saint Petersburg); Verlag für moderne Kunst (Vienna).

Exhibitions 
"In Dante Veritas", The State Russian Museum, Saint Petersburg, Russia, 2018

"The pulsating heart (Heart of hope)", Burning Man, USA, 2018

"La Collection Air", Lucerne, Switzerland, 2018

"Karl Marx Forever", Russian Museum, Saint Petersburg, Russia, 2019

"Anna Akhmatova. Poetry and Life", Branch of the Russian Museum, Malaga, Spain, 2019

"Authentic Human Bodies. Leonardo da Vinci", Palazzo Zaguri, Venice, Italy, 2019

"In Dante Veritas", Venice Biennale, Italy, 2019

"Why People Can’t Fly", Polytechnic Museum, Moscow, Russia, 2019

"Why People Can’t Fly", Burning Man, USA, 2019

"Why People Can’t Fly", Venice Biennale, Italy, 2019

"Art Panorama Inferno", Lucerne, Switzerland, 2020

"The Mind Port", Simon Lee Gallery, London, 2020

"Civilization. The Island of the Day Before", Kunstforum, Vienna, 2021

"In Dante Veritas: 4 Sins", Bad Breisig, Germany, 2021

"Big Bang" and "Gluttony", Osthaus Museum Hagen, Germany, 2021

"413", Moscow, Vienna, Malaga, 2021

"Dante's Mask", Lucerne and Zug, Switzerland, 2021

References 

1976 births
Living people
21st-century Russian sculptors
21st-century Russian businesspeople
Russian bankers
21st-century Russian architects